The Bible: Joseph is a 1995 German/Italian/American television miniseries about the life of Joseph from the Old Testament. It aired on TNT and was filmed in Morocco.

Plot 
In Egypt, Joseph is a Hebrew slave to Potiphar, chief of Pharaoh's palace guard. The overseer Ednan torments Joseph for his refusal to show deference, but Joseph earns his respect by reading, and Ednan increasingly relies on Joseph. Potiphar's wife unsuccessfully tries to seduce Joseph, and falsely accuses him of rape.

Joseph explains his life story to Potiphar to restore trust. Joseph is the eldest son of Jacob and Rachel. Their large family is marred by discord and violence. One day, Jacob gives Joseph a beautiful coat, which causes his envious half-brothers to sell Joseph into slavery.
Potiphar announces that Joseph will go to Pharaoh's prison for humiliating his wife. In prison, Joseph earns a reputation as a talented interpreter of dreams. He makes two accurate interpretations of the dreams of the royal cupbearer and the royal baker, both imprisoned on suspicion of theft.

Pharaoh summons Joseph to interpret his own troubling dreams. Joseph says that the seven fat cows and the seven full ears of corn in the dream mean that there will be seven years of plenty, but the seven sickly cows and the seven thin ears of corn signify seven years of famine. Joseph suggests that all the farmers give one fifth of their crop to Pharaoh for storage for the coming famine. Impressed, Pharaoh appoints Joseph as governor, second only to Pharaoh; he also gives Joseph a wife, Asenath, and Potiphar and Ednan now serve under Joseph.

Seven years later the famine begins. Joseph and Asenath have two sons, Manasseh and Ephraim. In Canaan, Jacob learns of the abundance in Egypt, and sends most of his sons to buy grain. Joseph recognizes his brothers but accuses them of spying and throws them into prison. Joseph insists they prove their innocence by bringing the youngest brother Benjamin to Egypt.

After the brothers bring Benjamin, he is framed for theft and arrested. When they rise up against their guards, Joseph reveals his true identity to all of them. Benjamin immediately embraces Joseph, but the others are ashamed. Joseph embraces each one in turn, saying that God used their evil intentions for an ultimate good, preparing Joseph for his current position so that he can provide for his extended family.

Joseph sends his brothers home to bring Jacob and the entire settlement to Egypt during the remaining five years of the famine. The clan arrives in Egypt to be reunited with Joseph.

Cast 

 Ben Kingsley – Potiphar
 Paul Mercurio – Joseph
 Martin Landau – Jacob
 Lesley Ann Warren – Potiphar's Wife
 Alice Krige – Rachel
 Dominique Sanda – Leah
 Warren Clarke – Ednan
 Monica Bellucci – Pharaoh's Wife
 Stefano Dionisi – Pharaoh
 Valeria Cavalli – Asenath
 Kelly Miller – Tamar
 Gloria Carlin – Bilhah
 Michael Angelis – Reuben
 Vincenzo Nicoli – Simeon
 Colin Bruce – Levi
 Michael Attwell – Judah
 Davide Cincis – Dan
 Rodolfo Corsato – Naphtali
 Pete Lee Wilson – Gad
 Silvestre Tobias – Asher
 Diego Wallraff – Issachar
 Michael Zimmerman – Zebulun
 Jamie Glover – Benjamin
 Rinaldo Rocco – Young Joseph (17 yrs)
 Timur Yusef – Young Joseph (8 yrs)
 Paloma Baeza – Dinah
 Brett Warren – Young Benjamin (9 yrs)
 Anna Mazzotti – Zilpah
 Andrew Clover – Shechem
 Arthur Brauss – Hamor
 Eric P. Caspar – Bera
 Anton Alexander – Hirah
 Milton Johns – Cupbearer
 Renato Scarpa – Baker
 Peter Eyre – Vizir
 Timothy Bateson – Priest
 Nadim Sawalha – Ishmaelite
 Josh Maguire – Manasseh
 Gabriel Thomson – Ephraim
 Oliver Cotton – Architect

Crew 

 Directed by Roger Young
 Teleplay by Lionel Chetwynd
 based on the novel by James Carrington
 Produced by Lorenzo Minoli and Gerald Rafshoon
 Music by Marco Frisina and Ennio Morricone
 Director of Photography Raffaele Mertes
 Film Editor: Benjamin A. Weissman, ACE
 Costumes by Enrico Sabbatini

Awards 

Emmy Award
 Outstanding Miniseries
 Emmy Award nominations
 Art Direction
 Casting
 Sound Editing
 Supporting Actor: Ben Kingsley
 Writers Guild of America nomination
Lionel Chetwynd

See also 
List of films featuring slavery
List of historical period drama films and series set in Near Eastern and Western civilization

External links
 

1995 television films
1995 films
German television films
Das Erste original programming
Italian television films
TNT Network original films
Films based on the Book of Genesis
Films about Christianity
Films directed by Roger Young
Films set in ancient Egypt
Primetime Emmy Award for Outstanding Miniseries winners
Primetime Emmy Award-winning television series
Films scored by Ennio Morricone
Bible Collection
Cultural depictions of Joseph (Genesis)
American television films
American drama films
1990s American films